Chriolepis is a genus of gobies native to the Atlantic and Pacific coasts of the Americas.

Species
There are currently 13 recognized species in this genus:
 Chriolepis atrimelum W. A. Bussing, 1997
 Chriolepis benthonis Ginsburg, 1953 (Deepwater goby)
 Chriolepis bilix Hastings & Findley, 2013 (Double-filament goby) 
 Chriolepis cuneata W. A. Bussing, 1990 (Rail goby)
 Chriolepis dialepta W. A. Bussing, 1990
 Chriolepis fisheri Herre, 1942 (Translucent goby)
 Chriolepis lepidota Findley, 1975
 Chriolepis minutillus C. H. Gilbert, 1892 (Rubble goby)
 Chriolepis prolata Hastings & Findley, 2015 (Platform goby) 
 Chriolepis roosevelti (Ginsburg, 1939) (Roosevelt's goby)
 Chriolepis tagus Ginsburg, 1953 (Mystery goby)
 Chriolepis semisquamata (Rutter, 1904) (Secret goby)
 Chriolepis vespa Hastings & Bortone, 1981 (Wasp goby)
 Chriolepis zebra Ginsburg, 1938 (Gecko goby)

Two species, C. bilix and C. prolata, are classified in the genus Pinnichthys by some authorities, as is C. atrimelum but this has not been reflected in FishBase.

References

Gobiidae